Dariusz Sztylka (born 28 May 1978 in Wrocław) is a retired Polish footballer who spent the most of his career at Śląsk Wrocław. He played as a midfielder.

Career

Club
At the beginning of his career, Sztylka played for Wratislavia Wrocław. Then he moved to Zagłębie Lubin. Next he played for Polar Wrocław and again moved to Zagłębie Lubin. In 1999, he returned to Polar Wrocław. In 2001, he moved to Śląsk Wrocław where he played ten years.

He announced his retirement on 30 May 2011. He changed his mind two weeks later and continued career with Śląsk Wrocław. After the end of the 2011-12 season, on 21 July 2012, he finally ended his playing career with the Ekstraklasa champions.

References

External links
 

1978 births
Polish footballers
Zagłębie Lubin players
Śląsk Wrocław players
Living people
Sportspeople from Wrocław
Association football midfielders
Polar Wrocław players
Ekstraklasa players